The Military College of Engineering (MCE) is an engineering college located at Risalpur in Nowshera District, Khyber Pakhtunkhwa, Pakistan. It was established by  Pakistan Army. MCE conducts courses for officers which includes civil engineering, Transportation engineering, Structural engineering, Geotechnical engineering, Construction anagement, Mining engineering, Disaster Emergency Management, Water Resources Engineering & Water resource management degree for officers, technical cadets and civil students. College also offers Combat & other Military education and training courses for authorized personnel.

About the college
Military College of Engineering (MCE), Risalpur is a constituent college of National University of Sciences and Technology, Pakistan (NUST). It is one of the institutes offering civil engineering in Pakistan.  Its students, upon graduation, serve in Pakistan Army Engineering Corps plus also many civilian students are hired by some of the well known construction and engineering firms in Pakistan and the world. College offers both undergraduate & postgraduate courses. Certain courses are also offered to officers of allied countries. These are Saudi Arabia, UAE, Qatar, Oman, Sri Lanka, Bangladesh, Bahrain, Malaysia and Myanmar.   

To further the cause of knowledge, the College sought collaboration with reputed universities abroad apart from qualifying its students in various civil engineering disciplines from a number of universities in USA.

History

A year after the Independence of Pakistan, the School of Military Engineering (SME) was established at Sialkot in 1948.
Having functioned at Sialkot for over four years, SME was shifted to Risalpur in 1952. Here it grew and expanded its sphere of activity beyond the combat related training and started with dispensation of civil engineering knowledge through regular Bachelor of Engineering classes. It gradually transformed into a full-fledged and matured engineering college and was named College of Military Engineering (CME). 
In 1958, the institution was renamed as Military College of Engineering (MCE).
In 1962 it was given the charter of self degree awarding and autonomous institution status by Government of Pakistan.
In 1988 it was affiliated in with University of Engineering and Technology, Lahore for post-graduate studies.
MCE also sought collaboration with well reputed Michigan State University of the United States of America.
Scores of graduates have attained their higher education degrees from universities in the United States and United Kingdom.
After establishment of National University of Sciences & Technology (NUST) in 1995,Military College of Engineering became one of its constituent colleges.

MES School
MES School is an establishment and training centre of E-in-C Branch GHQ for the professional training and development of Military Engineering Service (MES) officers. It is also located at Military College of Engineering (MCE) & Commandant MCE is an administrative head of this Officer training school.

Combat Engineering Wing
Combat Engineering Wings of Military College of Engineering train Military Personnel so they can perform a variety of construction and demolition tasks under combat conditions. Such tasks typically include constructing and breaching trenches, tank traps and other fortifications, bunker construction, bridge and road construction or destruction, laying or clearing land mines and other physical work in the battlefield. More generally, the combat engineer's goals involve facilitating movement & support of friendly forces while impeding that of the enemy.

Disaster Management and EOD Wing
Disaster Management and EOD Wing train the Security personnel as explosive ordnance disposal (EOD) technicians, who are specially trained to deal with the construction, deployment, disarmament and disposal of explosive munitions and may include other types of ordnance such as nuclear, biological and chemical weapons along with improvised explosive devices (IED). Disaster management branch deals with mitigation and management of Disasters that may include floods, earthquakes, landslides etc.

Academics

Departments

The college has five departments.

Department of Structural Engineering
The Department of Structural Engineering is committed to impart latest knowledge and quality education related to Structural Engineering. The Department of Structural Engineering is one of the biggest departments of MCE, NUST in terms of the faculty and UG/PG teaching/research activities. Structural Engineering is the trunk of Civil Engineering. Department of Structural Engineering is a vibrant department in Military College Of Engineering Risalpur. The Department has established its strong reputation by developing National and international links and has the faculty known in Pakistan and around the Globe.

Department of Transportation & Geotechnical Engineering
The Department of Transportation and Geotechnical Engineering is committed to impart the latest knowledge and quality education related to Transportation Engineering, Geotechnical Engineering, and Engineering Geology. The Department under highly qualified, experienced, and dedicated faculty is excelling to produce good quality engineers who can serve the nation in a befitting manner. Previously only two mandatory courses each in Transportation and Geotechnical Engineering were being offered.

Department of Construction Engineering & Management
MCE's Department of Construction Engineering Management (CE&M) offers Masters's level qualification to students with a background and education in disciplines relevant to civil engineering and construction. The degree program provides opportunities for structured learning combined with research. The curriculum offered aims to enrich students with knowledge and expertise in areas of construction project planning, economics, finance, procurement, project execution, monitoring and control, and other critical areas of building and infrastructure delivery and management.

Department of Basic Sciences & Humanities
The Department of Basic Sciences and Humanities, being part of a  uni-discipline “engineering” college, is committed to achieving academic excellence in teaching and scholarly endeavors, as well as serving the academic community and the public at large. The importance of non-engineering subjects in shaping and polishing of our engineers can be well visualized by the fact that HEC (Higher Education Commission) and PEC (Pakistan Engineering Council) have set a threshold of 30% share of non-engineering subjects in Bachelor of Engineering Degree curriculum.

Department of Water Resources Engineering & Management
The Department of Water Resources is imparting latest knowledge and quality education related to Fluid Mechanics and Water resource management. The Department constitute highly qualified, experienced and dedicated faculty who are contributing towards knowledge with practical application and endeavoring to produce good quality engineers who can serve the nation in a befitting manner. Lectures are delivered by the faculty in the classrooms using state of the art teaching aids.

Offered programs

BS CIVIL ENGINEERING
MS STRUCTURAL ENGINEERING 
MS CONSTRUCTION ENGINEERING AND MANAGEMENT 
MS DISASTER MANAGEMENT
MS TRANSPORTATION ENGINEERING
MS GEOTECHNICAL ENGINEERING 
MS MINING ENGINEERING
PHD GEOTECHNICAL ENGINEERING 
PHD TRANSPORTATION ENGINEERING
PHD MINING ENGINEERING
 Other Offered Elective Courses

Facilities and infrastructure

Laboratory facilities
Strength of Materials Lab
Geotechnical Lab
Transportation Lab
Hydraulics Lab
Geology Lab
Concrete Lab
Public Health Engineering Lab
Electrical Tech Lab
Mechanical Tech Lab
Survey Lab
BIM Lab
Dynamic Structure Lab
2 x Software/Computer Lab
Linguistic Lab

Sports facilities
4 x Squash courts
5 x Tennis courts
1 x Football ground
2 x Hockey ground
2 x Volleyball courts
1 x Cricket ground
2 x Jogging tracks
1 x Swimming pool
Futsal ground
1x Gymnasium/fitness facilities

See also
National University of Science and Technology, Pakistan
College of Aeronautical Engineering
College of Electrical & Mechanical Engineering
Military College of Signals
Army Medical College
Pakistan Engineering Council
Higher Education Commission (Pakistan)

References

External links
 MCE official website
 NUST official website
NUST LMS
NUST CMS

National University of Sciences & Technology
Universities and colleges in Nowshera District
Military academies of Pakistan
Engineering universities and colleges in Pakistan
Military education and training in Pakistan
Educational institutions established in 1948
1948 establishments in Pakistan